Mway Medaw was a queen consort of King Kyawswa I of Pinya. Of Pagan royalty, she was one of the two principal queens consort of Kyawswa, and she was known as the Queen of the Northern Palace. She was a paternal aunt of King Swa Saw Ke of Ava.

Ancestry
The following is her ancestry as reported by the Hmannan Yazawin chronicle. She was the youngest child of King Kyawswa of Pagan and his chief queen Saw Soe.

References

Bibliography
 
 

Pagan dynasty
Queens consort of Pinya
13th-century Burmese women
14th-century Burmese women